Alirajpur is one of the 52 districts of Madhya Pradesh state in India. It was created from Alirajpur, Jobat and Bhabra tehsils of the former Jhabua district on 17 May 2008. It is the least literate district in India as per Census 2011. Alirajpur is the administrative headquarters of the district. It includes the city of Alirajpur.

Origin of name
The district is named after its headquarters, Alirajpur, which was the capital of the former princely state of Ali Rajpur. The name of this town is derived by conjoining Ali (the fortress town and the former capital of the princely state founded by Anand Deo in 1437) and Rajpur (the latter capital).
According to the 2011 census Alirajpur district has a population of 728,677, roughly equal to the nation of Bhutan or the US state of Alaska. This gives it a ranking of 498th in India (out of a total of 640). The district has a population density of 229 inhabitants per square kilometre (590/sq mi). Its population growth rate over the decade 2001–2011 was 19.4 per cent. Alirajpur has a sex ratio of 1,009 females for every 1,000 males, and a literacy rate of 37.22 per cent, the lowest in India.

Divisions
This district comprises five tehsils: Alirajpur, Jobat, Sondwa Chandra Sekhra Ajad Nagar and Kathiwada.

Presently, there are two Madhya Pradesh Vidhan Sabha constituencies in this district: Alirajpur and Jobat. Both of these are part of Ratlam Lok Sabha constituency.

Demographics

According to the 2011 census Alirajpur district has a population of 728,999, roughly equal to the nation of Bhutan or the US state of Alaska. This gives it a ranking of 498th in India (out of a total of 640). Its population growth rate over the decade 2001–2011 was 19.45 per cent. Alirajpur has a sex ratio of 1,009 females for every 1,000 males, and a literacy rate of 37.22 per cent, the lowest in India. Scheduled Castes and Scheduled Tribes make up 3.69% and 88.98% of the population respectively.

Almost 90% of the population speaks different Bhili dialects. At the time of the 2011 Census of India, 53.68% of the population in the district spoke Bhilali, 35.42% Bhili, 7.27% Hindi and 1.87% Gujarati as their first language.

See also
 Jambukheda

References

External links
 Official website

 
Districts of Madhya Pradesh